Barış Çakmak (born 5 July 1979) is a Turkish actor who has been involved in television series, theatre plays and films.

Career
Çakmak studied Ancient Greek and Latin at Istanbul University, and graduated from the Istanbul University State Conservatory in Drama and Performing Arts in 2004. From 2002-2004, he played Osman Karacahan in the TV series Zerda. In 2007, he played Haydar in the TV series Fikrimin İnce Gülü. From 2009-11, he played Selim in Hanımın Çiftliği, which was a period drama TV series based on  Kemal Tahir's novel Lady's Farm. In 2012, he played Selim Aliç in Mavi Kelebekler (Blue Butterflies), a TV series about Bosnian war that was broadcast on Turkey's national network TRT.Now he plays Azad in "küçuk gelin" or "little bride"

Çakmak also participated in feature films. His debut role was Hakan in Gönderilmemiş Mektuplar (Unsent Letters), a film directed by Yusuf Kurçenli. In 2010, he took part in Mordkommission Istanbul, a movie produced by Ziegler Film Company for German TV channel ARD, and a short film The Death of Tennessee Williams in which he played the title character.

In theatre, he starred in My Name is Red, a period drama adapted from Orhan Pamuk's novel of the same name; it was produced by Goldhawk Productions and later broadcast by the BBC. He starred in a play called Korku İmparatorluğu (Fear Empire). He was involved in theatre productions for A Streetcar Named Desire and Play It Again Sam.

His voicing career includes him being the corporate identity voice-over for the company Eczacıbaşı between the years 2004-2006. He also does voice-overs for Greenpeace.

Filmography

External links 
 
 
 Sinema Türk'te Barış Çakmak
 BBC 4 My Name is Red Barış Çakmak

1979 births
Living people
Turkish male film actors
Turkish male stage actors
Turkish male television actors
Istanbul University alumni